Dadrahman Bazar (also Romanized as Dādraḩmān Bāzār; also known as Kalmatī) is a village in Polan Rural District, Polan District, Chabahar County, Sistan and Baluchestan Province, Iran. At the 2006 census, its population was 192, in 47 families.

References 

Populated places in Chabahar County